The 1965 USA Outdoor Track and Field Championships men's competition took place between June 25-26 at Balboa Stadium in San Diego, California. The women's division held their championships separately in Columbus, Ohio.

The Marathon championships were run in October at the Yonkers Marathon.

One of the highlights of this meet was the 6 mile run, where Olympic Champion Billy Mills, known for his stunning sprint in the Olympics ("Look at Mills, Look at Mills!") was run down by Gerry Lindgren.  Mills surged to take a narrow victory, both men being given the same time, which was the world record.

Also running was Olympic double champion Peter Snell and 1500 silver medalist Josef Odložil as visiting international athletes.  Snell had just lost his world record in the mile to Michel Jazy two weeks earlier.  While Jim Ryun was a high school star who had run in that same race in the Olympics, his win here was his first American record, narrowly pushed by competition from Snell and Jim Grelle.  Olympic Champions Bob Schul and Warren "Rex" Cawley also won.

Results

Men track events

Men field events

Women track events

Women field events

See also
United States Olympic Trials (track and field)

References

 Results from T&FN
 results

USA Outdoor Track and Field Championships
Usa Outdoor Track And Field Championships, 1965
Track and field
Track and field in California
USA Outdoor Track and Field Championships
Sports competitions in California
Track and field in Ohio
USA Outdoor Track and Field Championships
USA Outdoor Track and Field Championships
Sports competitions in Ohio